Social media can have both positive and negative impacts on a user's identity. Psychology and Communication scholars study the relationship between social media and identity in order to understand individual behavior, psychological impact, and social patterns. Communication within political or social groups online can result in practice application of those identities or adoption of them as a whole. Young people, defined as emerging adults in or entering college, especially shape their identities through social media.

Young adults 
At the stage where a young adult becomes an emerging adult, individuals are especially influenced by social media. Psychologists study methods of self-presentation to determine how a user's patterns and media participation affects their own identity. Young adults, through media literacies, can also find their identity as a part of social group, such as feminists. These studies are connected to building frameworks for educators on teaching media literacies. Due to their fluency in media literacy, young people often contribute to these larger social identities through their networks, and unique style of communication when sharing information.

Young Individuals have been found to be affected at what they take in on Social Media. Psychologists believe that at a time when young adults are coming into adolescence, that they are more likely to be influenced by what they see on sites like Instagram or Twitter. More so directed towards the times of Identity Formation. With the advance of social media, most young adults will widely share, with varying degrees of accuracy, honesty, and openness, information that previously would have been private or reserved for select individuals. Key questions include whether they accurately portray their identities online, and whether use of social media might impact young adults’ identity development. Media Imagery, in particular, is said to be a major influence on the minds of young men and women. Studies have shown that it is even more relevant when it comes to the issue of body image.  Social Media, partially, has been created to host safe haven to those that do not claim a solid identity in the material world, giving chance for exploration of other identities in the virtual concept. Psychologists and Scholars have noted that past identities can not easily be escaped from; the Internet is more permanent.

Media literacy 
The definition of media literacy has evolved over time to encompass the range of experiences that occur in social media or other digital spaces. Currently, media literacy includes being able to understand, apply, and share digital images and messages. Educators teach media literacy skills because of the vulnerable relationship that young adults have with social media. Some examples of media literacy practices, particularly on Twitter, include using hashtags, live tweeting, and sharing information.

Self presentation 
People create images of themselves to present to the public, a process called self presentation. Depending on the demographic, presenting oneself as authentic can result in identity clarity. Methods of self presentation can also be influenced by geography. The framework for this relationship between a user's location and their social media presentation is called the spatial self. Users depict their spatial self in order to include their physical space as a part of their self presentation to an audience.

Pescott (2020) study found that the use of Snapchat filters in preteens has a great impact on how they present themselves online. Boys found filters to be more fun and used for entertainment, whereas girls used filters more as a beauty enhancer. This becomes dangerous for preteens who are not aware of when a filter is being used when consuming content from friends, influencers, or celebrities. The same study found that the use of filters can have a large impact on preteens’ identity formation as they begin to compare themselves with others.

The audience

Audience interaction will change the way people present themselves on social media platforms.

Influences on Body Image 
In comparison to traditional forms of media, where individuals could only act as consumers of media, social media networking sites provide a more engaging opportunity where users can produce their own content, as well as interact with other users and content creators. As these sites have become increasingly popular throughout recent years, researchers have turned their focus to the discussion of the various impacts of social media use on users, one of the main focuses being the effects on body image, especially in adolescents and young adults.

Some studies have demonstrated that it isn’t the actual amount of time spent on social media sites that influences body image; Rather, body image is influenced by the way an individual engages with the site. For instance, Meier and Gray (2014), measured Facebook usage among young women and found that those who more frequently viewed posts of images and videos were more likely to experience negative thoughts about their own body image and internalize the thin ideal; however, Facebook use in general did not influence body image.

It has been suggested that in the early adolescent years, when perceptions about self and identity are being formed, individuals may be influenced by the media to feel certain ways about their bodies based on the ideal body types expressed and perpetuated in the media, which may increase body surveillance behaviors and, consequently, experiencing feelings of body shame. Salomon & Brown (2019), measured self-objectification behaviors on social media, body surveillance behaviors, feelings of body shame, and levels of self-monitoring to examine whether or not young adolescents engaging in higher amounts of self-objectification behaviors on social media also experienced higher levels of body shame. Self-objectification behaviors result from internalizing objectification from others, and may, for example, take the form of taking frequent photos of oneself and valuing how others view their appearance. Body surveillance behaviors indicate a preoccupation with how the appearance of one’s body will be perceived by others and can be measured by behaviors such as constant evaluation and monitoring of one’s body. Body shame refers to a negative emotional experience resulting from feeling as if one failed to meet society’s body ideals. Self-monitoring refers to how much individuals do or do not change their behavior in response to feedback and cues received from peers. In the study, it was found that individuals who reported engaging in self-objectified social media use exhibited more body surveillance behaviors, which led to increased experience in feelings of body shame.

In response to self-portraits on social media, friends and followers can indicate affirmation and acceptance, and creators can receive validation, through feedback such as likes and comments. According to the findings of Bukowski, Dixon, and Weeks (2019), the more value that an individual placed on the feedback received on a self-portrait that they’ve shared, the more they experience body dissatisfaction and a desire to become thinner, but only if they also engage in body-surveillance.

Studies have shown that users can also experience feelings of body dissatisfaction when consuming rather than creating content. In a study conducted by Fardouly, et al. (2015), the implications of Facebook usage on young women’s mood, level of body dissatisfaction, and desires to change aspects of their body or facial features were examined. The results of the study indicated that in addition to Facebook usage being associated with a more negative mood, it was associated with an increasing desire to change facial related features in women who were more likely to make comparisons between elements of their and others appearance.

Platform Affordances 
The different platform affordances of social media sites can both enable and constrain the options users have for presenting themselves. Initially coined by Gibson (1966), Affordances, broadly, can be defined as “describing what material artefacts such as media technologies allow people to do”. This can therefore be applied to how users of social media construct identity, through the ways in which social media sites provide users with opportunities for self-presentation.

For example, Instagram requires users to create a profile when they register an account. In this, they require a username, profile photo, biography and more recently, the option to present the users chosen pronoun. However, none of these identifiable aspects need to be factual, and - unlike Facebook which requires users to register with their legal name - Instagram users can use pseudonyms or made-up usernames and profile pictures - giving them the ability to construct whichever identity they choose to present.

References

Social media
Social impact
Identity (social science)